In the history of the Linnaean classification system, many taxa (e.g. species, genera, families, and higher taxonomic ranks) have become defunct or obsolete, and are no longer used.

Kingdoms

Animals

Protists

References

 
Biology-related lists